Chi Alpha Omega is a national Christian fraternity founded in 1987 at East Carolina University.  It is composed of seven chapters in North Carolina, one chapter in South Carolina, and one chapter in Georgia.

History
In Spring 1987, Chi Alpha Omega Fraternity was founded by students at East Carolina University in Greenville, North Carolina. This group became Alpha chapter and was co-educational in nature.  Beta chapter was founded at North Carolina State University in Raleigh, North Carolina in 1988.

The fraternity's growth continued in Fall 1994 when Gamma chapter was founded at the University of North Carolina in Chapel Hill, North Carolina.

In Spring 1995, Beta chapter at N.C. State became the flagship chapter, overseeing the affairs of the national organization. Under their leadership, a movement to unify by-laws and ritual across the organization was made.  In addition, Beta chapter hosted a formal for both Beta and Gamma chapters.

After having been lost, a copy of the original national constitution, promulgated by the founders of Alpha chapter in 1987, was found in Fall 1995.  The leadership of the Fraternity at Beta chapter  made plans updating and rewriting the Constitution to reflect the organizations actual structure and practice.

Finally, in Spring 1996, the National Constitution Committee developed a document that all the chapters ratified.

In 1998, the Beta chapter at North Carolina State University voted to form a sorority that would work with Chi Alpha Omega, and thus leave the fraternity.  This sorority is the second largest 
Christian sorority in the nation and is called Sigma Alpha Omega.

In 2005, the East Carolina University chapter reopened.  The chapter was restarted by Ryan Arp, Joe Deveaux, Charles Laughlin, Jason Schubert, Jamie Whitfield, Michael Williams, and Matt Wright.

About the fraternity
Chi Alpha Omega was established as "a national Christian fraternity. The fraternity strives to assemble Christian men together in a close Christ-centered brotherhood. Fraternity events include: Bible studies, prayer meetings, formals, social gatherings, service projects, fundraisers and much more."

Chapters
  - East Carolina University
  - North Carolina State University
  - University of North Carolina at Chapel Hill
  - Appalachian State University
  - UNC-Greensboro
  - Lander University
  - Campbell University
  - Western Carolina University
  - University of West Georgia

External links
 Official website of the national fraternity

East Carolina University
Christian fraternities and sororities in the United States
Student organizations established in 1987
Christian organizations established in 1987
1987 establishments in North Carolina